Bechet is a town in Romania.

Bechet may also refer to:

Places
 Bechet (crater), crater on Mercury
 Bechet, a village in Bobicești Commune, Olt County, Romania
 Bechet, a village in Orodel Commune, Dolj County, Romania
 La Ferrière-Béchet, comune in France
 Port of Bechet, Romania

People
 Ron Bechet (born 1956), American artist
 Sidney Bechet (1897–1959), American jazz musician

See also
 Behçet (disambiguation)